The Knowledge Machine is a concept of Seymour Papert, which is intended to enable children to explore any situation and engage them completely. Although Papert never clearly defined the Knowledge Machine, one interpretation is a virtual reality device that allows the user to slip into any situation and have a simulated experience of that situation.

The Knowledge Machine (KM) is also a developed system at the University of Texas for knowledge representation and reasoning within the artificial intelligence field. km was developed and continues to be actively maintained by Peter Clark and Bruce Porter.

References 

 Piotr Wozniak, Knowledge machine.

Virtual learning environments
Virtual reality